Typhoon Joan was an intense typhoon that caused minor damages in relative to the strength of the typhoon. Joan was the strongest typhoon of 1959 Pacific typhoon season, and one of the most intense Pacific typhoons on record. Joan formed from a surface center to the northeast of Guam on August 23, in which Japan Meteorological Agency began to track and classify the system as a tropical depression on the next day. A reconnaissance aircraft was sent to investigate the surface center and in 03:25 UTC on August 25 the surface center was classified as a tropical storm by Joint Typhoon Warning Center. The storm rapidly intensified into a typhoon in the same day it was formed. Shortly afterwards, Joan attained peak strength as a Category 5 equivalent typhoon on the Saffir–Simpson hurricane scale with winds of  before making landfall in Taiwan as a  typhoon, which was according to JTWC is the strongest landfall in the recorded history at the time. Once onshore, Joan did not degenerate quickly as Joan remained as a tropical cyclone for about one day before transitioning into a extratropical cyclone in 18:00 UTC of August 31. Extratropical remnants of Joan quickly traversed through South Korea and Japan before being last noted on 18:00 UTC, September 2.

In Taiwan, damages were considerable with 3,308 homes being destroyed and $3 million in crop damage were recorded. 11 people were killed and 74 people were injured during the onslaught of the storm. In mainland China, Joan caused 60 casualties, including 3 deaths. In South Korea, Joan caused several rivers on the Korean peninsula to overflow their banks, killing 17 people and injuring 21. Another 7,000 people were rendered homeless.

Meteorological history 

On August 23, surface analyses indicated a surface center was forming northeast of Guam as winds in Guam are shifting from easterlies to the northerlies. On August 24, JMA began to track the developing system and classified the system as a tropical depression.  A reconnaissance aircraft was sent to this area, and on August 25 at 03:25 UTC JTWC classified the system as a  tropical storm with JTWC giving the name Joan to the said storm. The new storm quickly intensified, as Joan became a typhoon in the midnight of the next day. By noon on the next day, Joan became a  typhoon while tracking to the west.

Joan quickly weakened after making landfall on Taiwan, with the winds falling into  after emerging in Strait of Taiwan at the midnight of August 30. Joan begins to slowly degenerate after the second landfall, though Joan remained on typhoon intensity for most of the day. However, by 18:00 UTC, Joan started to rapidly dissipate as JTWC published the last tropical cyclone warning on Joan. By the next day, Joan began recurving to the northeast while weakening further into a tropical storm. At 18:00 UTC on the same day, Joan transitioned into a extratropical cyclone while above Zhejiang, China. Emerging in the Yellow Sea as an extratropical low in the midnight of September 1, Joan quickly traversed through South Korea as a weak extratropical storm. By the evening of September 1, extratropical remnants of Joan emerged in the Sea of Japan. On September 2, extratropical remnants of Joan traversed through central Japan before being last noted at southeast of Tokyo in 18:00 UTC of the same day.

Preparations and impact

Taiwan
Roughly 140,000 people were evacuated to safer buildings across Taiwan. More than 33,000 people were evacuated to public buildings in Taipei, and more than 6,600 took shelter in Keelung. Joan's approach disrupted international air traffic to the island for 36 hours. According to data from the JTWC, Joan's sustained winds upon its Taiwan landfall were among the strongest in recorded history. At least 11 people were killed by Joan in Taiwan, and another 74 people were injured. The storm also destroyed 3,308 homes and caused $3 million in crop damage. The counties of Nantou and Pingtung bore the brunt of crop damage, with significant losses reported to banana, papaya, and rice. The loss of 20,000 banana trees in Nantou was valued at $555,000. About 50,000 homes were evacuated in Fuzhou.

Others
About 50,000 homes were evacuated in Fuzhou as the typhoon nears landfall. There were 60 casualties, including 3 deaths. Rainfall from Joan caused several rivers on the Korean peninsula to overflow their banks, killing 17 people and injuring 21. Another 7,000 people were rendered homeless.

See also 

Typhoon Bilis (2000)
Typhoon Goni (2020)

Notes

References

External links 
 Digital Typhoon : Typhoon 195909 (JOAN) – National Institute of Informatics

1959 Pacific typhoon season
Typhoons in Taiwan
1959 in Taiwan
1959 in China
Typhoons in China
1959 disasters in Asia